Count Gustav Siegmund Kálnoky von Kőröspatak (Hungarian: gróf Kálnoky Gusztáv Zsigmond) (December 29, 1832February 13, 1898), was an Austro-Hungarian diplomat and statesman.

Biography
Kálnoky was born in Letovice (Lettowitz), Moravia to an old Transylvanian family which had held comital rank in Hungary from the 17th century. After spending some years in a hussar regiment, in 1854 he entered the diplomatic service without giving up his connection with the army, in which he reached the rank of general in 1879. He was for the ten years (1860–1870) secretary of embassy at London, and then, after serving at Rome and Copenhagen, was in 1880 appointed ambassador at St. Petersburg. His success in Russia procured for him, on the death of Baron Heinrich Karl von Haymerle in 1881, the appointment of minister of foreign affairs for Austria-Hungary, a post which he held for fourteen years.

Essentially a diplomatist, he took little or no part in the vexed internal affairs of the Dual Monarchy, and he came little before the public except at the annual statement on foreign affairs before the Delegations. His management of the affairs of his department was, however, very successful; he confirmed and maintained the alliance with Germany, which had been formed by his predecessors, and co-operated with Bismarck in the arrangements by which Italy joined the alliance. Kálnoky's special influence was seen in the improvement of Austrian relations with Russia, following on the meeting of the three emperors in September 1884 at Skierniewice, at which he was present. His Russophile policy caused some adverse criticism in Hungary. His friendliness for Russia did not, however, prevent him from strengthening the position of Austria as against Russia in the Balkan Peninsula by the establishment later of a closer political and commercial understanding with Serbia and Romania. In 1885 he interfered after the battle of Slivnitsa to arrest the advance of the Bulgarians on Belgrade, but he lost influence in Serbia after the abdication of King Milan.

Though he kept aloof from the Clerical party, Kálnoky was a strong Catholic; and his sympathy for the difficulties of the Church caused adverse comment in Italy, when, in 1891, he stated in a speech before the Delegations that the question of the position of the Pope was still unsettled. He subsequently explained that by this he did not refer to the Roman question, which was permanently settled, but to the possibility of the Pope leaving Rome. The jealousy felt in Hungary against the Ultramontanes led to his fall. In 1895 a case of clerical interference in the internal affairs of Hungary by the nuncio Antonio Agliardi aroused a strong protest in the Hungarian parliament, and consequent differences between Dezső Bánffy, the Hungarian minister, and the minister for foreign affairs led to Kálnoky's resignation. He died in Brodek u Prostějova (Prödlitz).

He was awarded the Serbian order of Order of the Cross of Takovo.

Orders and decorations

See also 
 Triple Alliance
 Kálnoky family
 Valea Crişului

References

External links 
 Encyclopedia of Austria

1832 births
1898 deaths
Bohemian nobility
Hungarian nobility
Czech people of Hungarian descent
People from Letovice
Foreign ministers of Austria-Hungary
Knights of the Golden Fleece of Austria
Grand Crosses of the Order of Saint Stephen of Hungary
Grand Crosses of the Order of the Dannebrog
Bailiffs Grand Cross of Honour and Devotion of the Sovereign Military Order of Malta
Knights Grand Cross of the Order of St Gregory the Great
Recipients of the Order of the Cross of Takovo
Grand Crosses of the Order of Saint-Charles